Ruydar District is a district (bakhsh) in Khamir County, Hormozgan Province, Iran. At the 2006 census, its population was 11,628, in 2,675 families.  The District has one city: Ruydar.  The District has two rural districts (dehestan): Rudbar Rural District and Ruydar Rural District.

References 

Districts of Hormozgan Province
Khamir County